is a Japanese manga series written and illustrated by Gen Oosuka. It was serialized in Weekly Shōnen Jump from November 2021 to August 2022, and its chapters have been collected into five tankōbon volumes.

Plot
In a world where destructive creatures called Mononoke exist, a group called The Izanagi Force was created to combat these evil creatures. Dora Sasaki wishes to be a samurai to avenge the death of his mother, but finds that he cannot due to not having any supernatural energy. However, this changes when he meets a Mononoke called Kusanagi, who is pure-hearted and wishes to create a kind world. Together, they fight against the Mononoke and protect humanity.

Characters
Main Characters/Samurai
Dora Sasaki
One of the main protagonists of the series. A boy who wishes to slay mononoke after his mother was killed in an attack. He has no supernatural energy, but makes up for it with raw strength and incredible stamina.
Kusanagi
One of the main protagonists of the series. A pure-hearted mononoke who wishes to create a peaceful world. He is incredibly weak, but can shapeshift. He usually takes the form of a katana.
Ginchiyo Yagyu
A prideful girl who works for the Izanagi Force. She recruits Dora and Kusanagi after seeing their potential.
Heisuke Ujii
A samurai officer. He is very vain, and is always looking for praise. However, he is incredibly strong, and able to kill high-level momonoke.
Touma Toda
A samurai and Dora and Kusanagi's rival. He would get into fights with Dora a lot in the past, only to be immediately defeated every time.
Naotora Kamizumi
A shy and frequently embarrassed female samurai and Dora and Kusanagi's patrol partner. She has a crush on Dora, which is a secret that only Kusanagi knows.
Yuusai Yagyu
A Battalion Commander at Izanagi Corps.
Goki Tsukahara
The founder and former head of Izanagi Corps. Despite his old age, he can defeat multiple samurai simultaneously and with ease.
Hanzo Miyamoto
 The man who brought mononoke into the world fifty years before the events of the manga. Not much is known about him, other than that his face is covered in black bandages and that he used to train alongside Tsukahara.
Namishiro Kitabatake
A samurai at Izanagi Corps. He uses a supernatural technique that "watches his back" when he fights.

Mononoke
Hanya Gyuuki
The first major mononoke to appear in the manga; he is an ushi-oni who can shoot poisonous spines from his abdomen. He is defeated by Dora and killed by Hidehisa.
Hidehisa
One of the four humanoid mononoke hiding in Mushashino-kuni whose supernatural technique allows him to sprout snake-like appendages from his back and fire projectiles from them. After learning of Yoshihime's death, he fights Heisuke, and is killed when he is slashed in half and destroyed by Heisuke's supernatural energy.
Yoshihime
One of the four humanoid mononoke hiding in Mushashino-kuni whose supernatural technique allows her to produce webs on a massive scale. She fights Heisuke, and is killed when he cuts her in half and destroys her using his supernatural energy.
Tameemon
One of the four humanoid mononoke hiding in Mushashino-kuni whose supernatural technique allows him to increase his physical strength by consuming alcohol. He fights Dora  and Touma, and is killed when the former uses Kusanagi's spirit energy to cut him clean in half.
Kanbeh
The leader of the four humanoid mononoke hiding in Mushashino-kuni, implied to be of great power. His supernatural technique allows him to conjure dark fire. After seemingly sacrificing himself in an explosion in an attempt to kill Heisuke, it is later revealed that he is actually alive and operating elsewhere.
Dosan
A mononoke with an elephant-like nose who is hired by Kanbeh to capture Dora and Kusanagi. His supernatural technique allows him to create large amounts of fog that can distract opponents, create mirages, and revive deceased mononoke as lifeless pawns. He is later disintegrated by Kanbeh using a special ore.

Publication
Written and illustrated by Gen Oosuka, the series was serialized in Shueisha's Weekly Shōnen Jump magazine from November 29, 2021, to August 29, 2022. The series' individual chapters have been collected into five tankōbon volumes, released from April to October 2022.

The series is being simultaneously published in English by Viz Media and Shueisha's Manga Plus online platform.

Volume list

Reception
Christian Markle from CBR praised the series. He felt the main protagonist was similar to Black Clovers Asta, while also feeling the overall plot drew from My Hero Academia and Jujutsu Kaisen. Despite that, he felt they were different enough to make the series feel unique. Steven Blackburn from Screen Rant also offered some praise, though worried the series would take some elements of the plot of Ghost Reaper Girl that he did not like.

References

External links
  at Weekly Shōnen Jump 
 

Dark fantasy anime and manga
Samurai in anime and manga
Shōnen manga
Shueisha manga
Viz Media manga